Barking and Dagenham London Borough Council is the local authority for the London Borough of Barking and Dagenham in Greater London, England. It is a London borough council, one of 32 in London, the capital of the United Kingdom. It provides a broad range of local government services including Council Tax billing, libraries, social services, processing planning applications, waste collection and disposal, and it is a local education authority. Barking and Dagenham is divided into 17 wards, each electing three councillors. At the May 2022 election, the Labour Party won all 51 seats, for the fourth election in a row. The council was created by the London Government Act 1963 as the Barking London Borough Council and replaced two local authorities: Barking Borough Council and Dagenham Borough Council. The council was renamed on 1 January 1980. The next election to the authority will be in 2026.

History

There have previously been a number of local authorities responsible for the Barking and Dagenham area. The current local authority was first elected in 1964, a year before formally coming into its powers and prior to the creation of the London Borough of Barking on 1 April 1965. Barking replaced Barking Borough Council and Dagenham Borough Council. Both were previously urban district councils, with Barking Town Urban District Council replaced by Barking Borough Council in 1931, and Dagenham Urban District Council replaced by Dagenham Borough Council in 1938. As Barking had urbanised first, it was governed by a local board of health from 1882, which became an urban district council in 1894. The parish of Dagenham was under rural administration until 1926, governed by Dagenham Parish Council and the Romford Rural District Council from 1894.

It was envisaged that through the London Government Act 1963 Barking and Dagenham as a London local authority would share power with the Greater London Council. The split of powers and functions meant that the Greater London Council was responsible for "wide area" services such as fire, ambulance, flood prevention, and refuse disposal; with the local authorities responsible for "personal" services such as social care, libraries, cemeteries and refuse collection. As an outer London borough council it has been an education authority since 1965. This arrangement lasted until 1986 when Barking and Dagenham London Borough Council gained responsibility for some services that had been provided by the Greater London Council, such as waste disposal. Since 2000 the Greater London Authority has taken some responsibility for highways and planning control from the council, but within the English local government system the council remains a "most purpose" authority in terms of the available range of powers and functions.

Powers and functions
The local authority derives its powers and functions from the London Government Act 1963 and subsequent legislation, and has the powers and functions of a London borough council. It sets council tax and as a billing authority also collects precepts for Greater London Authority functions and business rates. It sets planning policies which complement Greater London Authority and national policies, and decides on almost all planning applications accordingly.  It is a local education authority  and is also responsible for council housing, social services, libraries, waste collection and disposal, traffic, and most roads and environmental health.

Summary results of elections

The council has been controlled by the Labour Party since it was first elected in 1964.

References

Local authorities in London
London borough councils
Politics of the London Borough of Barking and Dagenham
Leader and cabinet executives
Local education authorities in England
Billing authorities in England